K. T. Ponnambalam is a former Sri Lankan cricket umpire. He stood in two ODI games between 1985 and 1986.

See also
 List of One Day International cricket umpires

References

Year of birth missing (living people)
Living people
Sri Lankan One Day International cricket umpires
Place of birth missing (living people)